Rustle of Spring (German: Frühlingsrauschen) is a 1929 German silent romance film directed by William Dieterle and starring Dieterle, Lien Deyers and Julius Brandt. It was made by the German subsidiary of Universal Pictures and shot at the Halensee Studios in Berlin. The film's sets were designed by the art directors Otto Guelstorff and Ernst Stern.

Cast
 William Dieterle as Friedrich  
 Lien Deyers as Viola  
 Julius Brandt as Ole  
 Elsa Wagner as Friedrichs Mutter  
 Nikolai Malikoff as Großvater  
 Alexandra Schmitt as Beschließerin 
 Arthur Duarte 
 Vivian Gibson

References

Bibliography
 Bock, Hans-Michael & Bergfelder, Tim. The Concise CineGraph. Encyclopedia of German Cinema. Berghahn Books, 2009.

External links

1929 films
Films of the Weimar Republic
German silent feature films
Films directed by William Dieterle
Universal Pictures films
German black-and-white films
German romance films
1929 romance films
1920s German films
Films shot at Halensee Studios